John Ernest Arthur Mueller (9 September 1915 – 14 June 2001) was an Australian rules footballer who played for the Melbourne Football Club in the Victorian Football League (VFL).

Family
The son of Francis Carl Mueller (1880-1945), and Eliza Mary "Cissie" Mueller (1887-1960), née O'Brien, John Ernest Arthur Mueller was born on 9 September 1915.

He married Margaret Rose "Greta" Toohey on 14 April 1942.

Football
Mueller was famous for having only eight fingers, after losing two when he caught his hand in a machine at work.

He was an inspirational player who contributed significantly to the success of the Melbourne sides in which he played during the 1930s, '40s and '50s. He was notable as the primary instigator of Melbourne's 1948 flag victory after being recalled from retirement (with the reserves) for that year's Preliminary Final in which he kicked eight of his team's 25 goals against Collingwood. He followed this up with six out of 10 in the drawn Grand Final with Essendon and another six out of 13 the following week when Melbourne won the replay.

War Service
After initially being rejected in 1941 due to his missing fingers, Mueller served in the Australian Army from 1943 to 1945, playing very few games for Melbourne in these three seasons.

Post Football Career
In the late 1940s and 1950s, Mueller was a football commentator on 3KZ, working first with Norman Banks and later Philip Gibbs.  Mueller also worked with Gibbs on the program Football Inquest, which was later simulcast on 3KZ and GTV-9.

Death
Jack Mueller died on 14 June 2001 and is buried at Springvale Botanical Cemetery.

Footnotes

References
 
 Minchin, James, "Echuca's Greatest", The Riverine Herald, (Friday, 30 June 2000), p.28.
 
 AFL site: Australian Football Hall of Fame

External links

 
 
 Jack Mueller, at Boyles Football photos.

1915 births
2001 deaths
People from Echuca
Australian rules footballers from Victoria (Australia)
Australian Rules footballers: place kick exponents
Melbourne Football Club players
Australian Football Hall of Fame inductees
Keith 'Bluey' Truscott Trophy winners
Echuca Football Club players
Australian amputees
Melbourne Football Club Premiership players
Four-time VFL/AFL Premiership players
Burials in Victoria (Australia)
Australian Army personnel of World War II
Military personnel from Victoria (Australia)